On 25 August 2018, Indian National Congress President Rahul Gandhi has constituted the Core Group Committee, Manifesto Committee and Publicity Committee for the upcoming 2019 Indian general election.

Leadership

Slogans

'Ab Hoga Nyay'

Congress on Sunday 7 April 2019 launched its Lok Sabha campaign slogan 'Ab Hoga Nyay' (Now, There Will be Justice) by weaving a narrative around the "injustice" meted out to countrymen and "atmosphere of despair" prevailing in the country during the Narendra Modi government.

Chowkidar Chor Hai 

Chowkidar Chor Hai ( is a Hindi slogan used by the Indian National Congress in its campaign for the 2019 Indian general election. The slogan was coined by the Congress' Prime Ministerial candidate Rahul Gandhi as a slogan against Narendra Modi, with the intention of conveying that the person who was entrusted with safeguarding public money was in fact a thief.

Manifesto
The Congress Party manifesto can be found here: Congress Manifesto 2019

Results

Alliance and candidates

Committees

Core Group Committee

Manifesto Committee

Publicity Committee

References

External links 

2019 Indian general election
Indian National Congress campaigns
Indian general election campaigns